(Chamber Music) is the title for eight chamber music compositions by Paul Hindemith. He wrote them, each in several movements, during the 1920s. They are grouped in three opus numbers: Op. 24, Op. 36 and Op. 46. Six of these works, Kammermusik Nos. 2–7, are not what is normally considered chamber music – music for a few players with equally important parts such as a wind quintet – but rather concertos for a soloist and chamber orchestra. They are concertos for piano, cello, violin, viola, viola d'amore and organ. The works, for different ensembles, were premiered at different locations and times. The composer was the soloist in the premiere of the viola concertos, while his brother Rudolf Hindemith was the soloist in the premiere of the cello concerto.  is reminiscent of Bach's Brandenburg Concertos, also concertos for different solo and orchestra instruments, and in a neo-Bachian spirit of structure, polyphony and stability of motion.

Background 
Between 1921 and 1927, the majority of Germany's composers were writing nationalistic music, as Germany was recovering from World War I. Many Germans were shocked by the Armistice, and one particular soldier, Adolf Hitler, blamed it on Germany's lack of cultural unity. Over the course of his rise to political power, he repeatedly brought this up, with an emphasis on Richard Wagner, a composer whom he believed to be representative of true German culture.

Hindemith was not among the composers writing for the cause of cultural unification; his works were largely exploratory of the wind medium. Throughout his Kammermusik, he repeatedly used wind instruments. He utilized wind instruments in both works from Op. 24, with Kleine Kammermusik, Op. 24, No. 2, being a wind quintet for flute, oboe, clarinet, horn and bassoon. This work was experimenting with jazz and looking towards his colleague and friend Igor Stravinsky, who coincidentally also explored jazz with his Three Pieces for Solo Clarinet (1918). Its third movement was the result of a letter he received from an American composer describing jazz. In Hindemith's Kleine Kammermusik, Op. 24, No. 2, the composer alludes to Stravinsky by utilizing repeated patterns, similar to repetitive patterns in a groove-like rhythm in that movement. Hindemith references jazz in movement titles such as "Shimmy" and "Ragtime". The exploration of jazz by both Stravinsky and Hindemith reflects Ravel's practice of using Basque dance music. This work in particular would go on to become a staple in the wind quintet literature.

The six concertos of  have been compared to Bach's Brandenburg Concertos. Hindemith pursued polyphony and a "Baroque stability of motion" as neo-Bachian elements, in a "post-war reaction against the twin emotional excesses of Romanticism and Expressionism". Some musicologists and performers count only the numbered works as Hindemith's Kammermusiken, excluding the wind quintet.

Overview 

Hindemith's Op. 24 consists of two works. The first,  Op. 24, No. 1, was composed for a 13-piece orchestra. The second, Op. 24, No. 2, was for wind quintet.

Like Op. 24, Hindemith's Op. 36 also consists of multiple works,  Nos. 2–5. For example,  No. 3, Op. 36, No. 2 would be the third in the overall set, is included within Op. 36, and is the second piece within Op. 36.

Table of Kammermusiken 
In the table, the first column shows the title, the second the opus number (Op.), the third the number within the opus (No.), the fourth the type of composition, the fifth the number of movements if not 4 (M), and the sixth year and place of the premiere.

Compositions

Kammermusik No. 1 

 No. 1, Op. 24, No. 1 was composed in 1922, set for flute, clarinet, bassoon, trumpet, harmonium, piano, string quintet and percussion. It is structured in four movements:

It is dedicated to the Prince of Fürstenberg, "Dedicated to His Highness the Prince of Fürstenberg".
The composition was premiered in Donaueschingen on 31 July 1922 as part of the second Donaueschingen Chamber Music Festival, conducted by Hermann Scherchen.

After the premiere, Hindemith was stamped "the badboy" of the music of the 1920s. A reviewer wrote: "We've reached it at last! Modern German music has finally managed to embrace today's lifestyle having its fling at its most frivolous and vulgar. The man who brought about this wonder is the composer Paul Hindemith in his Kammermusik op. 24/1. One is confronted with a  kind of music the likes of which no German composer with an artistic attitude has ever even dared think about, let alone write, music of a lewdness and frivolity only possible for a very special kind of composer."

Kleine Kammermusik 

 (Small Chamber Music or Little Chamber Music), Op. 24, No. 2, was composed in 1922 for wind quintet. It is structured in five movements:

Hindemith composed the work for the Frankfurter Bläser-Kammermusikvereinigung (Frankfurt Wind Chamber Music Association), one of the first wind ensembles in Germany, and dedicated it to them. He took some material from the earlier work, Kammermusik No. 1, compared to which this was named Kleine. The music was premiered in Cologne on 13 June 1922 as part of the second Rheinisches Kammermusikfest (Rhenish Chamber Music Festival) by the Frankfurter Bläser-Kammermusikvereinigung. The duration is given by the publisher Schott as 13 minutes.

Kammermusik No. 2 

 No. 2, Op. 36, No. 1, was composed in 1924 as a chamber piano concerto, for piano and 12 instruments. The title on the composer's score is Kammermusik II (Klavierkonzert). It is structured in four movements:

The piano part is not in the tradition of virtuoso pianism, but returns to mostly two-part writing, similar to Bach's Inventions. It is an early work in neo-Bachian style. The work is dedicated to the pianist who was soloist in the premiere: "For Emma Lübbecke-Job". It was premiered in Frankfurt on 31 October 1924, with the Frankfurter Museumsorchester conducted by Clemens Krauss.

Kammermusik No. 3 

 No. 3, Op. 36, No. 2, was written in 1925, like a cello concerto for cello and ten instruments. The title of Hindemith's score reads: Paul Hindemith op 36 II / Kammermusik No III / für obligates Violoncello und zehn Soloinstrumente. It is structured in four movements:

It is dedicated: "For Elsa and Willi Hof". It was premiered in Bochum on 30 April 1925 by members of the municipal orchestra (Städtisches Orchester Bochum), conducted by the composer, with his brother Rudolf Hindemith as the cellist.

Kammermusik No. 4 

 No. 4, Op. 36, No. 3, was written in 1925, like a violin concerto for violin and a larger chamber orchestra. The title of Hindemith's score reads Paul Hindemith Op 36 3 | Kammermusik No IV | für Solo-Violine und grösseres Kammerorchester. It is structured in five movements:

Hindemith wrote in his catalogue that he enjoyed writing this work very much. He scored it for extreme registers, high piccolo flutes and low contrabassoon, bass tuba and four double basses, for a piercing tutti sound.
The music is dedicated: "Yashnykneshpeff for a dear lion's birthday" ("Yashnykneshpeff für eines lieben Löwen Geburtstag"). It was premiered in Dessau on 17 September 1925 for the opening concert of the concert series of the Friedrich Theatre, conducted by Franz von Hoesslin, with violinist Licco Amar as the soloist.

Kammermusik No. 5 

 No. 5, Op. 36, No. 4, was composed in 1925, like a viola concerto for viola and larger chamber orchestra ("für Solo-Bratsche und größeres Kammerorchester (Bratschenkonzert)"). It is structured in four movements:

The work is regarded as one of the most difficult viola concertos. The orchestra is formed by several wind instruments, and only cellos and double basses for strings, probably to grant the viola dominance. The last movement, named "variant of a military march" is based on the Bavarian Defilers' March which the viola "brings out of step".

The concerto is dedicated to Arnold Mendelssohn ("Herrn Professor Arnold Mendelssohn gewidmet"). Mendelssohn, the son of cousin of Felix Mendelssohn, was his teacher at the Musikhochschule Frankfurt. It was premiered at the Kroll Opera House in Berlin on 3 November 1927 by the Staatskapelle Berlin, conducted by Otto Klemperer, with the composer as the viola soloist.

Kammermusik No. 6 

 No. 6, Op. 46, No. 1, was written in 1927 as a concerto for viola d'amore and chamber orchestra ("für Viola d'amore und Kammerorchester (Viola d'amore-Konzert)"). It is structured in four movements:

The work bears no dedication. It was premiered in Cologne on 29 March 1928 by members of the municipal orchestra of Frankfurt (Städtisches Orchester Frankfurt), conducted by Ludwig Rottenberg, and the composer as the viola d'amore soloist. Reviewer Theodor W. Adorno noted then: "At times in the slow parts there are passages of a great, mournfully sad stillness, just like the mood in the evening on the edge of a large city". Hindemith revised the work with a less difficult solo part in 1929.

Kammermusik No. 7 

 No. 7, Op. 46, No. 2, was composed in 1927 as a concerto for organ and chamber orchestra ("für Orgel und Kammerorchester (Orgelkonzert)"). It is structured in three movements:

It is dedicated to the Frankfurt radio station ("Dem Frankfurter Sender gewidmet"). It was premiered in Frankfurt on 1 August 1928, conducted by Rottenberg, with Reinhold Merten as the organ soloist.

References

Further reading

 Haack, Helmut. 1977. "Die Doppelbedeutung des Terminus Kammermusik bei Hindemith". In Colloquium Musica cameralis Brno 1971, edited by Rudolf Pečman, 231–237. Colloquia on the History and Theory of Music at the International Music Festival in Brno, No. 6. Brno: Mezinárodní Hudební Festival.
 Heidenreich, Achim. 1999. "Zur Entstehung von Paul Hindemiths Kammermusiken Nr. 1–7". In Paul Hindemith: Komponist zwischen Tradition und Avantgarde—10 Studien edited by Norbert Bolin, 64–72. Kölner Schriften zur neuen Musik 7. Mainz: Schott Musik International. .
 Kohlhase, Hans. 1983. "Aussermusikalische Tendenzen im Frühschaffen Paul Hindemiths: Versuch über die Kammermusik Nr. 1 mit Finale 1921". Hamburger Jahrbuch für Musikwissenschaft 6:183–223.
 Motte, Diether de la. 1977. "Paul Hindemith neu gehört". Hindemith-Jahrbuch/Annales Hindemith 6.
 Rexroth, Dieter. 1977. "Zu den 'Kammermusiken' von Paul Hindemith". Hindemith-Jahrbuch/Annales Hindemith 6:47–64.
 Schaal, Susanne. 1996. "Paul Hindemith: Kammermusik Nr. 5 for Viola and Chamber Orchestra, Op. 36, No. 4, 1927". In Canto d'amore: Classicism in Modern Art and Music, 1914–1935, edited by Ulrich Mosch, Gottfried Boehm, and Katharina Schmidt, 343–345. Basel: Paul Sacher Stiftung. .
 Unverricht, Hubert. 1983. Kammermusik im 20. Jahrhundert. Zum Bedeutungswandel des Begriffs. Munich: Minerva.
 Wolff, Hellmuth Christian. 1977. "Die Kammermusik Paul Hindemiths". In Colloquium Musica cameralis Brno 1971, edited by Rudolf Pečman, 435–446. Colloquia on the History and Theory of Music at the International Music Festival in Brno, No. 6. Brno: Mezinárodní Hudební Festival.

External links 
 
 Andy Brandt: Paul Hindemith and Kleine Kammermusic, Op. 24, No. 2 woodwind5.com 2016
 , Claudio Abbado, Berlin Philharmonic

Chamber music compositions
Compositions by Paul Hindemith
Concertos
Compositions for wind quintet
Cycles (music)
Music with dedications
1922 compositions
1924 compositions
1925 compositions
1927 compositions
Stefan Zweig Collection